Nabarangpur is a town, villa city and a municipality in Nabarangapur district in the Indian state of Odisha. It is the headquarters of Nabarangpur district.

Geography and Climate 
Nabarangpur is situated at 19.23 Degree north latitude and 82.55 degrees east longitudes. It is 582m above sea level.

The climate is a tropical monsoon in Nabarangapur like the rest of Odisha. Monsoon season is mainly during the months of July, August, September, and October, and is not as harsh as it is in other parts of the state, bringing about moderate rainfall.

Summers in Nabarangpur is slightly hot, and this season runs during the months of March, April, May, and June. The summer months will experience an average temperature of around 31.0 °C, a minimum temperature of 24.9 °C and a maximum temperature of 37.1 °C. During winter the average temperature is around 19.2 °C, the minimum temperature is 12 °C, and the maximum temperature is 26.5 °C.

Demographics
 India census, Nabarangapur had a population of 69,307. Males constitute 49.53% of the population and 50.47% are females.

Nabarangpur has an average literacy rate of 82.4%, higher than the national average of 74.0%.

Education
RCD High school is the oldest school in Nabarangpur established in 1934 for boys and Girls High School for girls. It is situated in Masjid Road in Pathan street. The school operates under Board of Secondary Education, Odisha.

Nabarangpur also has a Government Junior College for senior secondary education with Science, Arts, and Commerce streams.

Nabarangpur also has a Government Degree College offering a bachelor's degree in Science, Arts, and Commerce.

There is also a Women's College in Hirli Dongri Road, offering subjects in Arts.

School 
There is a Kendriya Vidyalaya in Chutiaguda, Nabarangpur and many schools as follows:

 Bapuji Public School,
 Unique Public School,
 Mother Teresa Public School,
 Tiny Tots Public School,
 Techno Gurukul School,
 Nabarangpur Public School,
 Theodore Public School,
 Bidyaniketan Higher Secondary School,
 Eklavya Model Residential School,
 Saraswati Sishu Vidya Mandir,
 Municipality High School,
 JELC High School.
 Kendriya Vidyalaya Sangathan

Colleges 
There are also many college in Nabarangpur:

 Raghavendra College
 Bidyarthi College
 Utkal Institute Of Arts & Management
 Government Polytechnic
 Model Degree College
 Sai Vinayak Jr. College

Cultural Heritage and Festival

Cultural Heritage 
Nabarangpur District has an ancient tradition of Art and Culture, which was predominantly displayed in the erstwhile Koraput District. Many artisans, mostly residing in a street of Nabarangpur town, carry on the age-old handicraft. They manufacture boxes, toys, sticks, chains, pedestals of Hindu Gods and Goddesses, idols of other Gods and Goddesses, pooja articles and other decorative masterpieces, which are unique in the area and testify exemplary craftsmanship. ‘Dhanya Laxmi’ (Goddess Laxmi with pedestal) is a unique craft in paddy carried on by the artisans of the Dabugaon area in the District. Earthen works of Tonda near Papadahandi also testify exquisite craftsmanship.

Languages like Bhotra, Gond, Kandha, Paraja, Odiya, Hindi, and Telugu are widely spoken in Nabarangpur District. Tribals of the District perform folk dance like Rinjodi, Dhemsha, Sailodi, Gond, Geet Kudia, Ghumura, Madhya, etc. Male and female tribals take part in the dance with exuberance amidst melodious song and beat of drums in the background. Toys, boxes, pedestals of Hindu Gods and Goddess, Puja Articles and other decorative masterpieces are made by local craftsmen.

Maa Bhandargharani in Nabarangpur is the presiding deity of the locality. The name signifies the preserver of wealth and protector of lives. She is also worshipped in nearby villages. Tuesdays and Saturdays are marked for special worships. Many devotees gather in the temple premises on every conceivable occasion to seek blessings of the Goddess. Maa Pendrani of Umerkote which is visited by many devotees is born out of a legend. A small village Pendra (Pendrahandi), near Umerkote, worships a pure soul named Pendrani, a married girl who was the victim of secret jealousy of her own brothers.

Festival

Mondei 
Mondei is a local festival that is widely celebrated in the Nabarangpur District. The word Mondei is derived from the Hindi word ‘Mondi’ which means a small market. This festival is celebrated by many people worshipping a common deity among prehistoric rituals. Fair and entertainment activities with folk dances and tribal opera can be seen for the whole night of the festival. Mondei is usually celebrated after harvesting of crops. The festival is observed at different popular locations throughout the District gathering men and women of the area and far off. There are various Socio-Cultural organizations that spearhead the cultural activities of the Nabarangpur District.

Rath Yarta 
Rath yatra is celebrated in Nabarangpur with great enthusiasm and spirit. People from neighbor towns and villages come here and celebrate the occasion.

Durga Puja 
Durga Puja is also one of the most celebrated festivals in Nabarangpur. Many Durga Puja Pandals are built across the city.

Tourism

How to Reach (Transportation) 
Nabarangpur District is connected only by road.

Road Distances 

 From Bhubaneswar – 580 km .                         
 From Visakhapatnam – 280 km                                     
 From Raipur – 320 km

Nearest Railway Stations 

 Jeypore – 40 km                                                
 Koraput – 66 km                                                            
 Kesinga 170 km

Nearest Airports 

 From Bhubaneswar – 580 km                            
 From Visakhapatnam – 280 km                                     
 From Raipur – 320 km
 From Jagdalpur - 90 km
 From Jeypore - 44 km

Religious Tourism 

 Maa Bhandar Gharani Mandir                                           
 Shri Jagannath Mandir                                
 Baba Akhandalamani Mandir
 Shiva Mandir                                                                     
 Sri Balaji Temple                                         
 Sri Satya Narayan Mandir
 Shridi Sai Baba Mandir                                                     
 Hanuman Mandir                                         
 Nabarangpur Satsang Vihar.
 Shri Adinath Digambar jain Temple                                  
 Shri Ram Mandir

Wildlife Tourism 

 The Deer Park of Nabarangpur District also attracts a large crowd. Watching Natures bounties from the watchtower in this park is a unique experience. One can reach hiring Taxis and auto-rickshaws to Deer Park that is 10 km from Nabarangpur towards Papadahandi.

Environmental tourism 

 Panchavati Bana and Shree Bana Forest Park attracts tourists and the residents of Nabarangpur for eco-tourism.

Sightseeing tourism 

 Hirli Dongri is situated at Gandhinagar of Nabarangpur town, where an ancient statue of Lord Balaji was found and being worshiped. Near to the Hirli Dongri Kusumjhar reserve is situated. District Administration has constructed watchtowers, Park at the hilltop, to facilitate the same. One can easily reach Hirli Dongri by auto-rickshaws available from Nabarangpur.
 Indravati River in the old highway attracts tourists because of the British Made Bridge and its surroundings.
 Indravati Dam, Khatiguda 45 km from Nabarangpur also attracts tourists throughout the year.

Historical tourism 

 The Sahid Smruti Stambha is situated at the bank of the river Tuni near Papadahandi. During the Quit India Movement on August 24, 1942, 19 freedom fighters died while fighting with British soldiers during the march towards Dabugam under the leadership of Madhab Pradhani. To keep it in memory of them Sahid Stamba was constructed and every year on 24 August Sahid Divas is observed. The spot still commemorates the freedom-loving people of the bygone era. Sahid Smrutistamba is 12 km away from Nabarangpur. One can hire taxi from Nabarangpur to reach Sahid Smruti Stamba.

Adventure tourism 

 Chandan Dhara is a natural waterfall situated in Jhorigam Block 90 km away from Nabarangpur. The place is also remarkable for a natural Shiva Lingam. Chandan Dhara is about 100 km from Nabarangpur towards Umerkote via Jharigaon. Taxi or auto rickshaws are to be hired from Nabarangpur to go to Chandan Dhara.

Lodge and Hotels 

1.Hotel Prakash MTPL Road Nabarangpur.
2.Hotel Manisha Main Road, Nabarangpur.
3.Hotel Hilltop Near Ichabatiguda Junction & MTPL Nabarangpur

Food and Cuisines 
Nabarangpur is known for its Odia cuisines and also for south Indian cuisines. There is a Gujarati and Rajasthani influence on food because of the numerous southern Indian, Gujarati and Rajasthani populations in the city. Many multi-cuisine restaurants have been opened in recent years, and many street food vendors operate in the city.The Famous Restaurant is Prakash Family Restaurant by Pooja Food

Politics 
Nabarangpur is often referred to as the land of Late Sadhashiv Tripathy the erstwhile chief minister of Odisha and a freedom fighter. He was elected to the Odisha Legislative Assembly for four consecutive terms first in 1951 then in 1957, 1961, and 1967. He served as the revenue minister of Odisha for a long time. He served as the Chief Minister of Odisha between 1965 February 21 to 1967 March 8.Habibulla Khan of INC was elected as the MLA from Nabarangpur Assembly Constituency in 1977, 1980, 1985, 1990, 1995, 2000 and 2004. He represented INC(I) in the 1980 elections. The current MLA is Sadasiva Pradhani of (BJD) who was elected in 2019.
Jagannath Tripathy, a freedom fighter was also the MLA of Nabarangpur.

References

Cities and towns in Nabarangpur district